Rules For Jokers is the third album by the English singer-songwriter by Thea Gilmore, released in 2001.

It was recorded at Chapel Studios in Lincolnshire and produced by Nigel Stonier. The album was a breakthrough for Gilmore with the songs "Holding Your Hand" and "Saviours And All" receiving substantial airplay on BBC Radio 2. The song "Inverigo" was written in Italy, in the town of Inverigo, in honour of Bob Dylan.

Reception
The album received positive reviews from AllMusic and Exclaim!.

Track listing

Personnel
Thea Gilmore - vocals, acoustic guitar, electric guitar, piano, kalimba, cimbala, mbira
Nigel Stonier - electric guitars, acoustic guitars, bass guitar, piano, organ, harmonica, voice
Robbie McIntosh - electric guitars, acoustic guitars, voice
Ian Thomas - drums, percussion, griddle pan (5)
Oliver Kraus - cello
David Coulter - saw, tenor banjo, Q-chord, slide didgeridoo, jaw harp, accordion
Dave 'Munch' Moore - organ (12), harpsichord
Ewan Davies - percussion, organ (10), Blue Tube, finger cymbals, voice
Freyja Gilmore - voice (8,10,12)
Will Bartle - voice, cymbal (5)
Sarah Jane Morris - voice (11)
Steve Menzies - voice (11)

References

External links
Gilmore's official website

2001 albums
Thea Gilmore albums